The 2003 Laurence Olivier Awards, celebrating excellence in West End theatre, were presented by the Society of London Theatre on Friday 14 February 2003, at the Lyceum Theatre, London. A recording of the ceremony was broadcast the next night on BBC Two.

Winners and nominees
Details of winners (in bold) and nominees, in each award category, per the Society of London Theatre.

Productions with multiple nominations and awards
The following 21 productions, including one ballet and three operas, received multiple nominations:

 5: Play Without Words and Twelfth Night
 4: A Streetcar Named Desire, Contact, My One and Only, Taboo, The Coast of Utopia and Uncle Vanya
 3: Chitty Chitty Bang Bang, Our House, Vincent in Brixton and Where Do We Live
 2: Ariadne auf Naxos, Bombay Dreams, Elaine Stritch at Liberty, Lobby Hero, Lulu, My Fair Lady, Polyphonia, Tryst and Wozzeck

The following seven productions received multiple awards:

 3: Twelfth Night and Uncle Vanya
 2: A Streetcar Named Desire, My Fair Lady, Play Without Words, Vincent in Brixton and Wozzeck

See also
 57th Tony Awards

References

External links
 Previous Olivier Winners – 2003

Laurence Olivier Awards ceremonies
Laurence Olivier Awards, 2003
2003 in London
Laur